Leigh Finke is an American politician serving in the Minnesota House of Representatives since 2023. A member of the Minnesota Democratic-Farmer-Labor Party (DFL), Finke represents District 66A in the Twin Cities metropolitan area, which includes the cities of Falcon Heights, Lauderdale, Roseville and Saint Paul, and parts of Ramsey County in Minnesota.

Early life, education and career 
Finke was born in Minnesota. She earned a Bachelor of Arts degree in English literature from Bethel University in 2003 and a Master of Arts in Shakespeare from DePaul University.

From 2007 to 2008, Finke worked as an adjunct professor of at DePaul University and Normandale Community College. Finke worked in renewable energy policy advocacy from 2011 to 2015. From 2013 to 2019 she was a reporter for Yes!, where she covered the intersection of justice movements and popular culture. From 2015 to 2018, she was a project manager at Sparkhouse. From 2018 to 2021, Finke was the Sr. Producer at 1517 Media. During her time as Sr. Producer,  she wrote and produced two documentary films, 'Ending the Silence: Confronting Sexual Shame in the Church' and White Savior: Racism in the American Church.' She also edited two non-fiction books for Beaming Books, 'Queerfully and Wonderfully Made' and 'Welcoming and Affirming'. In 2021 and 2022, she worked as Multimedia Storyteller for the ACLU of Minnesota. In late 2022, she was publicly critical of Republican gubernatorial candidate Scott Jensen for spreading the transphobic litter boxes in schools hoax.

Minnesota House of Representatives 
Finke was first elected to the Minnesota House of Representatives in 2022, after redistricting and the retirement of DFL incumbent Alice Hausman. She serves on the Environment and Natural Resources Finance and Policy, Human Services Policy, Judiciary Finance and Civil Law, and Legacy Finance Committees.

Electoral history

Personal life  
Finke is the first openly transgender person to serve in the Minnesota Legislature. She lives in St. Paul, Minnesota and has two children.

References

External links 

Women state legislators in Minnesota
Politicians from Saint Paul, Minnesota
Living people
Minnesota Democrats
Transgender politicians
Bethel University (Minnesota) alumni
DePaul University alumni
Year of birth missing (living people)
21st-century American politicians
21st-century American women politicians